The following lists events that happened during 1788 in the Dutch Republic.

Events

July
 July 13 - A hailstorm sweeps across France and the Dutch Republic with hailstones 'as big as quart bottles' that take 'three days to melt'; immense damage is done.

References

 
Dutch Republic
Dutch Republic